José Antonio Rodríguez Martínez (born 26 May 1931) is a Spanish politician and former president of Cantabria between 1982 and 1984.

References

1931 births
Presidents of Cantabria
People from Santander, Spain
Living people